White-eye is a family of small passerine birds.

White-eye may also refer to: 
White-eye (fish), a species of killfish
White-eye (soil), a type of silty or loamy soil
 White-eye, Subgenus Nyroca of Aythya
White (mutation), or white-eye mutation, a sex-linked fruit fly mutation
White-Eye, a lioness in the documentary TV series Big Cat Diary*
White-eye, whiteeye, White eye, a racially biased state in which one or more humans fail to see all humans are alike, Often used by whom those are designated as North American Aboriginals sometimes as "other". Example "Man these white eyes just wanna drive us to edge of City limits in the middle of winter"

See also
Griefer, a disruptive player of MMORPGs in Taiwan, known as "white-eyed"
White Eyes (disambiguation)

Animal common name disambiguation pages